The Battle of Chalagan was fought between the Kara Koyunlu and the allied forces of Kingdom of Georgia, the Princedom of Simsim and Shirvanshah at Chalagan, Azerbaijan, in December 1412, and resulted in Kara Koyunlu’s victory.

History 
The conflict was preceded by the fall of the Timurid Empire immediately after the death of the great conqueror Timur (1405) and the subsequent clashes between the various clans in Azerbaijan. Having taken control of Azerbaijan (around 1406), the Kara Koyunlu tribal federation leader, Abu Nasr Qara Yusuf, launched an offensive against Ibrahim I (1382-1417) of Shirvanshah who struggled against the Timurids in Northern Azerbaijan. Shirvan's former ally the Karabakh ruler Yar Ahmed Qaramanli sided with Abu Nasr Qara Yusuf, while Ibrahim joined his forces with the ruler of Shaki, Syed Ahmed Orlat and the Georgian king Constantine I, who was also allied to the prince of Simsim, Surakat, who marched in the head of 2,000 Georgian cavalry to support the Shirvanese allies.

A major battle was fought at the village Chalagan in December 1412 and ended in a decisive defeat of the allies. Ibrahim and Constantine fell at the hands of the fierce enemy. The Georgian king, his brother, and 300 Georgian officers were beheaded by the orders of Abu Nasr Qara Yusuf.

Victorious in the battle, Abu Nasr Qara Yusuf was able to secure his position against the threats from north, and focused now on Baghdad.

References

External links
 Kara Koyunlu

Chalagan 1412
15th century in Azerbaijan
Chalagan
1412 in Asia
1412 in Europe
15th century in the Kingdom of Georgia
1410s in the Middle East
Battles involving the Kara Koyunlu
Battles involving Chechnya
Battles involving Ingushetia
History of Chechnya
History of Ingushetia